The 2008 SBS Drama Awards is a ceremony honoring the best performances in television on the SBS network for the year 2008. It was held on December 31, 2008, at the SBS Open Hall in Deungchon-dong, Seoul, and was hosted by Ryu Si-won and Han Ye-seul.

Nominations and winners
Complete list of nominees and winners:

{| class=wikitable style="width="100%"
|-
! 
! 
|-
| valign="top" |
Moon Geun-young - Painter of the Wind as Shin Yun-bok| valign="top" |Moon Young-nam - First Wives' Club
|-
! 
! 
|-
| valign="top" |
Lee Joon-gi - Iljimae as Lee Gyeom/IljimaeKim Rae-won - Gourmet as Lee Sung-chan
Lee Beom-soo - On Air as Jang Ki-joon
Park Shin-yang - Painter of the Wind as Kim Hong-do
| valign="top" |Kim Ha-neul - On Air as Oh Seung-ahSong Yun-ah - On Air as Seo Young-eunKim Hae-sook - First Wives' Club as Ahn Yang-soon
Moon Geun-young - Painter of the Wind as Shin Yun-bok
|-
! 
! 
|-
| valign="top" |Park Yong-ha - On Air as Lee Kyung-minBong Tae-gyu - Working Mom as Park Jae-sung
Ji Hyun-woo - My Sweet Seoul as Yoon Tae-oh
Lee Sun-kyun - My Sweet Seoul as Kim Young-soo
Song Chang-eui - The Scales of Providence as Jang Joon-ha
| valign="top" |Choi Kang-hee - My Sweet Seoul as Oh Eun-sooLee Da-hae - Robber as Jin Dal-rae
Lee Young-ah - Iljimae as Bong-soon
Yum Jung-ah - Working Mom as Choi Ga-young
|-
! 
! 
|-
| valign="top" |Jang Hyuk - Tazza as Kim GoniKim Joo-hyuk - Terroir as Kang Tae-min
Kim Min-jun - Tazza as Young-min
Kim Rae-won - Gourmet as Lee Sung-chan
| valign="top" |Han Ye-seul - Tazza as Go Eun-sungHan Hye-jin - Terroir as Lee Woo-joo
Kim Sa-rang - Tokyo Sun Shower as Lee Soo-jin
Nam Sang-mi - Gourmet as Kim Jin-soo
|-
! 
! 
|-
| valign="top" |Ahn Nae-sang - First Wives' Club as Han Won-sooLee Hoon - I Am Happy as Jun-su
Lee Jin-wook - Glass Castle as Kim Joon-sung
Park Si-hoo - Family's Honor as Lee Kang-suk
| valign="top" |Kim Hye-sun - First Wives' Club as Han Bok-sooOh Hyun-kyung - First Wives' Club as Na Hwa-shinYoon Jung-hee - Family's Honor as Ha Dan-ah
Yoon So-yi - Glass Castle as Jung Min-joo
|-
! 
! 
|-
| valign="top" |Lee Moon-sik - Iljimae as Soe-dolAhn Gil-kang - Iljimae as Kongkal Aje
Lee Hyung-chul - On Air as Jin Sang-woo
Ryu Seung-ryong - Painter of the Wind as Kim Jo-nyun
| valign="top" |Kim Ja-ok - Working Mom as Kim Bok-silHong Ji-min - On Air as Lee Hye-kyung
Kim Sung-ryung - Iljimae as Dani
Moon Jung-hee - My Sweet Seoul as Nam Yoo-hee
|-
! 
! 
|-
| valign="top" |Son Hyun-joo - Tazza as Go Kwang-ryeolJin Goo - Tokyo Sun Shower as Park Sang-kil
Kim Kap-soo - Tazza as Agwi
Won Ki-joon - Gourmet as Gong Min-woo
| valign="top" |Kim So-yeon - Gourmet as Yoon Joo-heeJo Mi-ryung - I Love You as Na Jin-hee
Kang Sung-yeon - Tazza as Madam Jeong
Kim Ae-kyung - Gourmet as Madam Jo
|-
! 
! 
|-
| valign="top" |Lee Han-wi - Glass Castle as Son Dong-sikLee Kye-in - I Am Happy as Lee Cheol-kon
Lee Sang-woo - First Wives' Club as Koo Se-joo
Yoon Young-joon - Daughter-in-Law as Park Min-hyuk
| valign="top" |Kim Hee-jung - First Wives' Club as Mo Ji-ranHa Joo-hee - Aquarius as Myung Eun-young
Kim Yeon-joo - Daughter-in-Law as Kim Joo-ri
Park Won-sook - Glass Castle as Yoon In-kyung
|-
! 
! 
|-
| valign="top" |Bong Tae-gyu - Working Mom as Park Jae-sungMoon Jung-hee - My Sweet Seoul as Nam Yoo-heeDaughter-in-Law as Lee Soon-jung| valign="top" |Go Dae-hwa|-
! 
! 
|-
| valign="top" |Do Ki-seok - Iljimae
| valign="top" |
Yeo Jin-goo - Iljimae as young Lee GyeomKim Yoo-jung - Painter of the Wind as young Shin Yun-bok|-
! 
! 
|-
| valign="top" |Lee Joon-gi - Iljimae as Lee Gyeom/IljimaeHan Ye-seul - Tazza as Go Eun-sung
Jang Hyuk - Tazza as Kim Goni, Robber as Kwon Oh-joon
Kim Ha-neul - On Air as Oh Seung-ah
Kim Rae-won - Gourmet as Lee Sung-chan
Lee Beom-soo - On Air as Jang Ki-joon
Moon Geun-young - Painter of the Wind as Shin Yun-bok
Oh Hyun-kyung - First Wives' Club as Na Hwa-shin
Park Yong-ha - On Air as Lee Kyung-min
Song Yun-ah - On Air as Seo Young-eun
| valign="top" |Moon Geun-young and Moon Chae-won (Painter of the Wind)
Ahn Nae-sang and Kim Hee-jung (First Wives' Club)
Jang Hyuk and Han Ye-seul (Tazza)
Ji Hyun-woo and Choi Kang-hee (My Sweet Seoul)
Kim Rae-won and Nam Sang-mi (Gourmet)
Lee Beom-soo and Kim Ha-neul (On Air)
Lee Jin-wook and Yoon So-yi (Glass Castle)
Lee Joon-gi and Han Hyo-joo (Iljimae)
Oh Hyun-kyung and Lee Sang-woo (First Wives' Club)Park Yong-ha and Song Yun-ah (On Air)|}

Top 10 Stars
Ahn Nae-sang - First Wives' ClubHan Ye-seul - TazzaJang Hyuk - TazzaKim Ha-neul - On AirKim Rae-won - GourmetLee Joon-gi - IljimaeMoon Geun-young - Painter of the WindOh Hyun-kyung - First Wives' ClubPark Yong-ha - On AirSong Yun-ah - On AirNew Star Award
Bae Soo-bin - Painter of the WindCha Ye-ryun - Working MomChae Young-in - Temptation of WifeHa Seok-jin - I Am HappyHan Hyo-joo - IljimaeIm Jung-eun - AquariusJi Hyun-woo - My Sweet SeoulLee Joon-hyuk - First Wives' ClubLee Sang-woo - First Wives' ClubMoon Chae-won - Painter of the WindYoon So-yi - Glass Castle''

References

External links
 

SBS
SBS Drama Awards
SBS
December 2008 events in South Korea